Thomas Watt may refer to:
Thomas Watt (politician), South African politician
Tom Watt (ice hockey), Canadian ice hockey scout and coach
Tom Watt (actor), English actor, writer and broadcaster
Tommy Watt, Scottish jazz bandleader
Thomas Watt, prosecution witness, see Kenneth Littlejohn

See also
Thomas Watts (disambiguation)
Thomas Watt Gregory
Thomas Watt Hamilton